The Années folles ("crazy years" in French) was the decade of the 1920s in France. It was coined to describe the rich social, artistic, and cultural collaborations of the period. The same period is also referred to as the Roaring Twenties or the Jazz Age in the United States. In Germany, it is sometimes referred to as the Golden Twenties because of the economic boom that followed World War I.

Precursors 

The Utopian positivism of the 19th century and its progressive creed led to unbridled individualism in France. Art nouveau extravagance began to evolve into Art Deco geometry after the First World War.

André Gide, who founded the Nouvelle Revue Française literary review in 1908, influenced Jean-Paul Sartre and Albert Camus. Tristan Tzara's 1918 Dada manifesto and the resulting Dada movement were very much a product of the interbellum: "Dadaists both embraced and critiqued modernity, imbuing their works with references to the technologies, newspapers, films, and advertisements that increasingly defined contemporary life". All these served as the precursors for the Années folles.

Café society 

Cafés around Paris became places where artists, writers, and others gathered.  On the Rive Gauche (left bank) the scene centered around cafés in Montparnasse while on the Rive Droite (right bank), the Montmartre area.

Left bank 
The Années folles in Montparnasse featured a thriving art and literary scene centered on cafés such as Brasserie La Coupole, Le Dôme Café, Café de la Rotonde, and La Closerie des Lilas as well as salons like Gertrude Stein's in the rue de Fleurus.

The Rive Gauche, or left bank, of the Seine in Paris, was and is primarily concerned with the arts and the sciences. Many artists settled there and frequented cabarets like Le Boeuf sur le Toit and the large brasseries in Montparnasse. American writers of the Lost Generation, like F. Scott Fitzgerald and Ernest Hemingway, met and mingled in Paris with exiles from dictatorships in Spain and Yugoslavia.

The painters of the School of Paris for example included among others Chaïm Soutine, Amedeo Modigliani, and Marc Chagall, who were Lithuanian, Italian, and Russian, respectively. Later the American Henry Miller, like many other foreigners, gravitated to the rue Vavin and Boulevard Raspail. Montparnasse was, he said, "the navel of the world". Gertrude Stein also lived in Montparnasse during this period.

Right bank
Montmartre was a major center of Paris nightlife and had been famous for its cafés and dance halls since the 1890s. Trumpeter Arthur Briggs played at L'Abbaye and transvestites frequented La Petite Chaumière. After World War I, the artists who had inhabited the guinguettes and cabarets of Montmartre, invented post-Impressionism during the Belle Époque.

In 1926, the facade of the Folies Bergère building was redone in Art Deco style by the artist Maurice Pico, adding it to the many Parisian theatres of the period in this architectural style.

Art

Surrealism 

Surrealism came to the forefront in the 1920s cultural scene, bringing new forms of expression to poetry with authors like André Breton, whose Surrealist Manifesto appeared in 1924, Louis Aragon, Paul Éluard, and Robert Desnos. Émigré artists had created Post-Impressionism, Cubism, and Fauvism in Paris before World War I, and included Pablo Picasso, Marc Chagall, Amedeo Modigliani, and Piet Mondrian, along with French artists Pierre Bonnard, Henri Matisse, Jean Metzinger, and Albert Gleizes.

Surrealists also included artists like Max Ernst, Joan Miró, Salvador Dalí, and Francis Picabia, sculptors like Jean Arp, Germaine Richier and even early film-makers, like Luis Buñuel and René Clair.

Avant-garde 

Jean Cocteau, while he denied belonging to the surrealists, was unquestionably avant-garde and collaborated with many of its members.

Entertainment 

In the 1920s, Parisian nightlife was greatly influenced by American culture. One of its greatest influences was the ragtime called jazz, which became very popular in Paris. "Ragtimitis" came to Paris with a rendition of "The Memphis Blues" by a U.S. Army band led by New York Army National Guard Lieutenant James Reese Europe. The band, known as the Harlem Hellfighters of the 369th Infantry Regiment, "... started ragtimitis in France". According to band member Noble Sissle. It was very successful in 1925 at the Théâtre des Champs-Élysées where the Revue Nègre also was playing, led first by Florence Mills, known by her stage name as Flossie Mills, and later by Josephine Baker.

In 1926, Baker, an African-American expatriate singer, dancer, and entertainer, caused a sensation at the Folies Bergère. In a new revue, La Folie du Jour, in which she danced the number "Fatou" wearing a costume revealing all but a skirt made of a string of artificial bananas. Wearing only her loincloth of bananas, Baker suggestively performed "danse sauvage" to a Charleston tempo – a genre still new to Europe. Her French producer Jacques-Charles produced her dance numbers with French preconceptions of eroticized savages in mind. Baker performed the piece mostly nude with her partner, Joe Alex. This dance inspired a 1929 tempera painting titled Josephine Baker, first shown by the painter Ivanhoe Gambini in an exhibition of the Radiofuturista Lombardo group he founded.

The scandal which erupted over Baker's dancing gave way to enthusiasm and quickly generated excitement among Parisians for jazz and black music. The Charleston can be danced solo, in pairs or in groups, to the rhythms of jazz. It is based on the movements of the body weight from one leg to the other, with the feet turned inward and knees slightly bent.

Of all the fashionable cabarets, the most famous was called Le Boeuf sur le Toit where the pianist and French composer Jean Wiener played. Such entertainment reached only a tiny part of the French population, the elite. Nevertheless, it gave the impulse, created the event.

American influence

American culture of the Roaring Twenties had a substantial influence on France, which imported jazz, the Charleston, and the shimmy, as well as cabaret and nightclub dancing. Interest in American culture increased in the Paris of the 1920s, and shows and stars of Broadway theatre introduced as innovations for the élite and were imitated thereafter.

This was the case for the famous Revue Nègre in 1925 at the Théâtre des Champs-Élysées. Josephine Baker danced the Charleston almost naked, with provocative gestures set to music by Sidney Bechet. Important Paris designers like Paul Poiret fought to design clothes for her. Inspired and influenced by the French Colonial Empire, Josephine Baker put on La Folie du Jour in 1926, and from the cafés chantants, also successfully picked up popular songs such as La Petite Tonkinoise by Vincent Scotto. In 1927 she starred in the silent film Siren of the Tropics, which opened to rave reviews. The 1930 song J'ai Deux Amours enshrined Baker as a full-featured star of Parisian nightlife, who not only danced, but also commented on the music and did comedy.

While she appeared at the Folies Bergère, Baker opened her own nightclub, called "Chez Joséphine", in the rue Fontaine.

Dance

Paul Guillaume in 1919 organized a "Negro festival" at the Théatre des Champs-Élysées. Six years later, he also produced the Paris La Revue Nègre. On rue Blomet, the Bal Nègre cabaret attracted both aesthetes and the curious.

Ballets suédois 
The 1920s also marked a renewal in ballet. The Ballets Russes were based in Paris during this time. In 1921 the Ballets suédois offered L'Homme et son désir by Paul Claudel, with music by Darius Milhaud. The company then presented Les mariés de la tour Eiffel, written by Jean Cocteau. Alas, it did not meet with public success. In 1923 another ballet was born, La création du monde; Darius Milhaud wrote the music, and Blaise Cendrars the scenario. Fernand Léger designed the costumes and put onto the stage gigantic animals, birds, insects and totemic gods.

The adventure of the Ballets suédois ended in 1924 with a ballet called Relâche written by Erik Satie and sets by Francis Picabia.

Salon gatherings were another important form of entertainment. Princess de Polignac's gatherings continued to be important to avant-garde music. The circles of Madame de Noailles included Proust, Francis Jammes, Colette, Gide, Frédéric Mistral, Robert de Montesquiou, Paul Valéry, Cocteau, Pierre Loti, Paul Hervieu, and Max Jacob.

Music

During this period the music hall permanently replaced the café-chantant. People often went to the Casino de Paris, the Paris concert, the concert Mayol and the theater; spectacles, attractions, and songs occurred at a rapid pace. Artistic productions had a meteoric rise. Some of the best-known examples were American-influenced shows at the Casino de Paris -- Paris qui dance (1919), Cach' ton piano (1920), and Paris qui jazz (1920–21), Mon homme and  Dans un fauteuil gave rise to stardom for Maurice Chevalier and Mistinguett. American influences such as musicals underlay the success of the Folies Bergère, the famous "Mad Berge", inaugurated with Les Folies raging in 1922.

A number of classical music composers, such as those of the School of Paris and Les Six, also flourished at this time. "The musical influence of Paris, dominated first by Debussy and then by Stravinsky, seems to have been almost inescapable for composers in the first four decades of the century."

Operetta 

Operetta had a turning point on 12 November 1918 with the premiere of Phi-Phi by Henri Christiné and Albert Willemetz. Up to a thousand performances were played in just two years.  The popular Dédé was staged in 1921 by Maurice Chevalier.

Operetta attracted talented composers such as Marseille's Vincent Scotto, and also Maurice Yvain (a composer of Mistinguett's signature song Mon Homme), and author Sacha Guitry, who wrote the libretto for L'amour masqué.

In the Olympia at the Bobino, the Théâtre de la Gaîté-Montparnasse showcased Marie Dubas and Georgius, who inaugurated the Singing Theatre by staging popular songs. From 1926, American titles such as No, No, Nanette, Rose-Marie and Show Boat began to be adapted for French viewers.

Sports 

Sports spectacles were also popular during the Années folles. Attendance at sporting venues increased significantly in the years following the war and the press gave sporting events an audience and growing popularity. The newspapers played a significant role in promoting sports through dedicated sports pages, giving popularity to the Tour de France, football and rugby. Moreover, sports, which previously had been limited only to those of affluent backgrounds, now began to extend to the masses. The major sporting event during this decade was Olympic Games in Paris in 1924, in which 3,092 athletes from 44 countries participated, and no fewer than  spectators attended.

Film 
Silent film, called "cinéma", rose to popularity in the 1920s. Scientists of the time were predicting little future for it. Silent film is considered by some as the carefree innocence of years or 7th Art. Max Linder, after being discovered by Charles Pathé, became integral in making the film a cultural phenomenon.

European film production almost completely stopped during World War I, as most actors were drafted into the war. The public took refuge in theaters trying to forget the horrors of the front with films such as Charlie Chaplin's A Dog's Life. Hollywood films saw massive growth in demand thanks to a sharp decline in European production; it exported an increasing number of films. In 1919, films from the United States accounted for about 90% of films screened in Europe.

Some films showed the influence of surrealism, with director Luis Buñuel collaborating with Salvador Dalí on his first short film, Un Chien Andalou. René Clair's silent films blended comedy and fantasy.

Theatre 
In the Paris of the 1920s, the theater was essentially dominated by four directors -- Louis Jouvet, Georges Pitoëff, Charles Dullin and Gaston Baty. They decided in 1927 to join efforts to create the "Cartel of Four." However, they had much less success than Sacha Guitry in Théâtre des Variétés. There are also parts of Alfred Savoir, comedies of Édouard Bourdet and those of Marcel Pagnol that met with some success.

Specifically, the theatrical performance was a great success with audiences and had an undeniable renewal in 1920, first at the stage performance. Around the "Cartel" develops a creative effort to bring in staging the concerns and aspirations of the time. The change is also reflected in the choice of themes and atmosphere that emerges from the works presented. But parallel to this, the educated public is interested elites increasingly to authors and works that combine classical in the form and the opposition reality/dream at the theatrical atmosphere. Also, the theater Jean Cocteau, the first pieces of Jean Giraudoux such as Siegfried in 1928 and the works of Italian Luigi Pirandello are famous examples that were very successful.

In 1920 post-impressionist painter Nils Dardel and de Maré together created Ballets suédois at the Théâtre des Champs-Élysées. In the autumn of 1924, Giorgio de Chirico curated the scenography and costumes for Luigi Pirandello's "The Jar".

The birth of a popular culture 

Along with the elite culture that characterized the 1920s, there arose at the same time in Paris, a popular culture. The First World War upset many things, even in song. After four years without Belle Époque, new artists emerged in fashionable places. The music hall, for example, while attracting artists and intellectuals in search of novelty, also gives the popular media.

In the same period were the beginnings of Maurice Chevalier, the ultimate illustration of good French mood through one of his songs, "Valentine". The lead dancer Mistinguett, nicknamed La Miss, had successful popular tunes such as  Always on the grind,  I'm fed up.  All shows, however, does not reduce as the review.

Fashion and style

The emancipated look 
The garçonne (flapper) look in women's fashion emerged in Paris, promoted especially by Coco Chanel. The boyish look was characterized by a loose, streamlined, androgynous silhouette where neither the bust nor the waist are evident, accompanied by a short hairdo. It became the symbol of the emancipated woman: free and autonomous, and expressing a new social freedom for a woman—she goes out on the town, smokes, dances, engages in sports or outdoor activities, drives a car, goes on trips—and, flying in the face of moral conventions of the day, she flaunts an extra-marital liaison, perhaps even her homo- or bisexuality, or cohabits openly with a partner.

Also by Chanel, the celebrated little black dress came out in 1926. A straight sheath with 3/4 sleeves and no collar, the crêpe de Chine tube all in black (a color previously reserved for bereavement) was the perfect evocation of garçonne style, erasing the forms of the female body. Copied many times over, this "Ford signed 'Chanel'" as Vogue magazine dubbed it, referring to the mass-produced American car, would become a classic item of womenswear of the 1920s and beyond.

Economic growth
The Années folles were also a period of strong economic growth. New products and services in booming markets boost the economy: radio, automobile, aviation, oil, electricity. French production of hydropower increases eightfold during the decade. Cheaper electricity favored industrial companies, which in 1928 had three of the top five highest market capitalizations on the Paris stock exchange and five out of the top ten, in a decade where total stock market valuation soared by a factor of 4.4. The 6th is a young innovative company, which is only fifteen Air Liquide, already has a global stature. The manufacturing production index reached in 1928 the level of 139 for a 100 in 1914, with very strong sectoral disparities: it is only 44 for the index shipbuilding 100 to steel and 422 to the automobile. The French overall index fell to 57 in 1919 and 50 in 1921, but already risen to 104 in 1924. It took 6 years to clear the shortage of energy caused by the reconstruction of the northern mines, that the Germans had drowned during the World War I.

Radio

Radio played a leading role, becoming a preferred vehicle for the new mass culture. It provided greater information on news and culture to an increasing number of people, especially the working classes. Radio quickly propelled Mistinguett and Maurice Chevalier to the rank of national and international stardom, and they quickly become icons of Parisian lifestyle.

End of an era

The Wall Street Crash of 1929 brought an end to the exuberant zeitgeist in the United States, although the crisis didn't actually reach Europe until 1931. In 1928, the Parisian theater La Cigale, then the Olympia and the Moulin Rouge suffered the same fate in 1929, being torn down at the end of the decade. Although production was intended for a wide audience, most people attended music halls and other dance halls. Their world of song was primarily that of the street, the javas and tangos of dances, weddings, and banquets and not of the Parisian high society. Parallel to this culture of elites, at the same time in Paris, existed a popular culture that was increasingly successful and came to dominate the late 1920s and early 1930s through artists such as Maurice Chevalier or Mistinguett.

See also 

 International Style (architecture)
 Paris between the Wars (1919–1939)
 Weimar culture
 1920s in jazz
 1920s in Western fashion

References

Further reading

 Berstein, Serge et Milza, Pierre, Histoire de la France au XXe siècle, Brussels, Complexe, 1995, 573 pages
 Berstein, Serge et Milza, Pierre, Histoire de l'Europe contemporaine, Le XXe siècle: de 1919 à nos jours, Paris, Initial, Hatier, repub. 2002, 378 pages
 

 Abbad, Fabrice, La France des années 1920, Paris, Armand Colin, coll. Cursus, 1993, 190 pages
 Becker, Jean-Jacques et Berstein, Serge, Nouvelle Histoire de la France contemporaine: 12.Victoire et frustrations, 1914-1929, Paris, Éditions du Seuil, coll. Points; Histoire, 1990, 455 pages
 Philippe Bernert et Gilbert Guilleminault, Les Princes des années folles, Paris, Plon, 1970
 Deslandres, Yvonne et Müller, Florence, Histoire de la mode au XXe siècle, Paris, Sogomy Éditions d'Art, 1986
 Les Années folles, sous la direction de Gilbert Guilleminault, Paris, Denoël, 1956
 Jacqueline Herald, Fashions of a decade: the 1920s, London, B.T. Betsford Ltd, 1991
 Jean-Jacques Lévêque, Les Années folles. 1918-1939, Paris, ACR, 1992
 Tartakowski, Danielle et Willard, Claude, Des lendemains qui changent ? La France des années folles et du Front populaire, Paris, Messidor, 1986, 270 pages
 Daniel Gallagher, D'Ernest Hemingway à Henry Miller : Mythes et réalités des écrivains américains à Paris (1919 - 1939), L'Harmattan, 2011
 Fabrice Virgili et Danièle Voldman, La Garçonne et l'Assassin. Histoire de Louise et de Paul, déserteur travesti, dans le Paris des années folles, Paris, Payot, 2011 .

 Paul Dietschy et Patrick Clastres, Sport, société et culture en France du XIXe siècle à nos jours, Paris, Hachette, coll. Carré histoire, 2006, 254 pages
 Loyer, Emmanuelle et Goetschel, Pascale, Histoire culturelle de la France; De la Belle Époque à nos jours, Paris, Armand Colin, coll. Cursus, 2001, 272 pages

 Jean-Paul Bouillon, Journal de l’Art Déco, Genève, Skira, 1988

 Henri Behar et Michel Carassou, Dada. Histoire d’une subversion, Paris, Fayard, 1990
 Marc Dachy, Journal du mouvement Dada 1915-1923, Genève, Skira, 1989
 Matthew Gale, Dada & Surrealism, London, Phaidon Press, 1997

 Michel Collomb, La Littérature Art Déco. Sur le style d’époque, Paris, Méridiens Klincksieck, 1987

 Richard Hadlock, Jazz masters of the twenties, New York, Macmillan, 1965

 Henry Louis Jr. Gates & Karen C.C. Dalton, Josephine Baker et La Revue Nègre. Lithographies du Tumulte Noir par Paul Colin, Paris, 1927, translated by Delphine Nègre, Paris, Éditions de La Martinière, 1998

 Desanti, Dominique, La Femme au temps des années folles, Paris, Stock-Laurence Pernoud, 1984, 373 pages

 Christine Bard, Les Garçonnes. Modes et fantasmes des Années folles, Paris, Flammarion, 1998

 Planche, Jean-Luc, Moulin Rouge !, Paris, Albin Michel, 2009, 192 pages
 Planiol, Françoise, La Coupole : 60 ans de Montparnasse, Paris, Denöel, 1986, 232 pages

 Delporte, Christian, Mollier, Jean-Yves et Sirinelli, Jean-François, Dictionnaire d'histoire culturelle de la France contemporaine, Paris, PUF, Quadrige Dicos Poche collection, 2010, 960 pages

Roaring Twenties
 
Historical eras
LGBT history in France